María Fernanda Aristizábal Urrea (born 19 June 1997) is a Colombian model and beauty pageant titleholder who was crowned Señorita Colombia 2019. Aristizábal is the first delegate from Quindío to ever be crowned Miss Colombia. She represented Colombia in Miss Universe 2022 and placing Top 16.

Early life
Aristizábal was born in Armenia, Quindío. Her father is Bernardo Alonso Aristizábal Franco and her mother is Bertha Lucía Urrea Posso. She is of Basque descent, from Spain and France. Aristizábal completed her elementary and high school education at the Catholic school Colegio Franciscano San Luis Rey in Armenia. She later graduated with a degree in social communication from Luis Amigó Catholic University in Medellin in July 2021.

Pageantry

Miss Colombia 2019

Aristizábal began her pageantry career in 2019, after being crowned Miss Quindío 2019. This title gave her entry into the Señorita Colombia 2019 competition, representing Quindío Department. 

The competition began in November 2019, held in Cartagena. In pre-pageant activities, Aristizábal emerged as a frontrunner after winning a number of special awards, including Queen of the Police and Best Body.

Finals night was ultimately held on 11 November. Aristizábal made the first cut into the top ten, and then continued into the top five. She was ultimately crowned Miss Colombia 2020 by outgoing titleholder Gabriela Tafur, becoming the first woman from Quindío Department to win the title, besting first runner-up María Alejandra Salazar of Huila Department. As Miss Colombia, she was to represent Colombia at Miss Universe 2020. In June 2020, Natalie Ackermann gained ownership of the Colombian franchise to Miss Universe, confirming that a new pageant would be held to select the Colombian representative in 2020, and that Aristizábal would not be going to Miss Universe.

Miss Universe 2022
After finishing her reign as Miss Colombia, she began talks to be appointed as Miss Universe Colombia 2022. After reaching an agreement, she was announced on 6 April 2022 as Colombia's representative at Miss Universe 2022 through a press conference. As a result, Natalia López Cardona, the first runner-up of Señorita Colombia 2021, also from Quindío Department, replaced her to compete in Miss International 2022. At the end of the 71st edition of Miss Universe, she ended up her journey early as Top 16 semifinalist.

References

External links

1997 births
Colombian beauty pageant winners
Colombian female models
Living people
Miss Colombia winners
People from Armenia, Colombia
People from Quindío Department
Colombian people of Spanish descent
Colombian people of French descent
Colombian people of Basque descent
Miss Universe 2022 contestants
Luis Amigó Catholic University alumni